Elegidos, la música en tus manos is an Argentine reality television singing competition which began airing on Telefe on April 14, 2015. It is based on the Israeli singing competition HaKokhav HaBa (meaning "The Next Star") made by Keshet Broadcasting Ltd. The program format lets viewers vote for contestants via mobile apps. It is filmed live in Buenos Aires.

The celebrities working as experts for the show, are the same coaching line up from Argentine version of The Voice: Axel, Soledad Pastorutti, Puma Rodríguez and the duet Miranda!. Also the presenter is the same, Marley, who is accompanied by La Voz... Argentina second runner up, Antonela Cirillo, who works as a social media correspondent.

Format

Auditions

In contrast to other singing competition TV shows which feature a cast of celebrity judges, Elegidos: La música en tu manos features a cast of celebrity experts and considers the viewers at home the judges.

During the first stage of the competition, each contestant is asked to perform a well-known song in front of the judges in an audition room. After the song a vote is taken among judges whether to transfer the applicant to the next stage facing the audience at home. If the judges are not sure about how to vote, the contestant is required to perform another song, and then a decision is made.

During each performance in the next stage, the audience at home is able to decide in real time whether or not a contestant is sent through to the next round by using a mobile voting app. In this stage, every contestant performs facing a wall that is down. During the performance, viewers at home and the judges have their times to vote. If the contestant reach 70% of the total votes, the wall raises up meaning the contestant advanced. If the contestant don't reach that percentage, it means the instant elimination.
	
While the viewers at home are considered the "judges", the expert panelists also influence the vote. During this stage's shows, a yes vote from one of the judges added 7% to the performers total.

Duels
Contestants who make it through the auditions are paired by the judges to face off in a duel. The first contestant to sing, chosen by a coin toss before the show, sings with the wall up and sets the benchmark for the second contestant. The second contestant sings with the wall down. If the second contestant betters the first contestant's vote total, the wall rises and the second contestant is through to the next round while the first contestant is eliminated; if the second contestant fails to raise the wall, the second contestant is eliminated and the first contestant is through.

The Round of Thirteen
After the duel rounds end, 13 of the contestants that survived perform. The first 7 contestants perform with the wall up, after which the contestant with the lowest vote total is placed in the hot seat. The subsequent contestants perform with the wall down, and they have to better the vote total of the contestant in the hot seat to raise the wall. If they succeed in doing so, the contestant in the hot seat is eliminated, the contestant with the next lowest vote total is placed in the hot seat, and the performing contestant is provisionally qualified; otherwise, the performing contestant is eliminated if they fail to raise the wall. This continues until the six contestants with the lowest number of votes are eliminated. In addition, the eliminated contestant with the highest number votes in each episode is given a save and is through the next round. In this stage, each panelist's vote counts as 5%.

Quarterfinals & Semifinals
The quarterfinals and semifinals follow the same format as the Round of Thirteen, except with a few changes to the weightage of the panelists' votes and number of contestants. In the quarterfinals, eight contestants battle for six spots, and each panelist's vote counts as 3%. In the semifinals, six contestants battle for four spots, and each panelist's vote counts as 1%.

Finale
During the finale, contestants are paired into a duel. The first contestant sings with the wall up and sets the benchmarks for the second contestant. The second contestant sings with the wall down. If the second contestant gets the higher percentage of votes, then the wall rises and the second contestant moves onto the next round of duels. However, if the second contestant's percentage is lower than the first contestant's, the wall stays down and the contestant is eliminated. In the second round, the two contestants that moved on will duel against each other with their second song. The same process applies for this round, except the running vote total is not revealed and both contestants sing with the wall up. The contestant with the higher vote percentage becomes the winner of Elegidos: La música en tus manos. The experts' yes vote counts as a home vote as they vote with their phones; their choices are not revealed to both the performers and the audience.

Season 1 (2015)

Auditions

Episode 1
April 14, 2015

Episode 2
April 16, 2015

Episode 3
April 21, 2015

Episode 4
April 23, 2015

During this fourth episode, Axel was replaced by singer Kike Teruel.

Episode 5
April 28, 2015

Episode 6
April 30, 2015

Episode 7
May 5, 2015

Elimination table

Blue numbers  indicate the highest voting percentage for each week.
Red numbers indicate the lowest voting percentage of each week.
 The performer was eliminated that week.
 The performer won Rising Star.
 The performer was the runner-up.
 The performer placed third.
 The performer placed fourth.

References

External links

Rising Star (franchise)
Argentine reality television series
Telefe original programming
2015 Argentine television series debuts